Mendes is a census-designated place and unincorporated community in Tattnall County, Georgia, United States. Its population was 124 as of the 2020 census. Georgia State Route 169 passes through the community.

Demographics

References

Populated places in Tattnall County, Georgia
Census-designated places in Georgia (U.S. state)
Unincorporated communities in Georgia (U.S. state)